Taavetti Jeremias Kalliokorpi (25 July 1869, Hämeenkyrö - 5 April 1949) was a Finnish farmer and politician. He was a member of the Parliament of Finland from 1907 to 1908, representing the Social Democratic Party of Finland (SDP).

References

1869 births
1949 deaths
People from Hämeenkyrö
People from Turku and Pori Province (Grand Duchy of Finland)
Social Democratic Party of Finland politicians
Members of the Parliament of Finland (1907–08)